The Leicester Arena, known for sponsorship reasons as the Morningside Arena Leicester, is a multi-purpose built sports arena located in Leicester, England. The arena has a seating capacity for 3,000 spectators. The arena's main tenants are the basketball team Leicester Riders.

Background
The £4.8 million arena, which is owned by the Leicester Riders Foundation, was officially opened in January 2016. It is used as the home venue for the basketball team Leicester Riders, as well as the wheelchair basketball team the Leicester Cobras.  It is also used by the students of Leicester College as well as by the local community.  It hosted its first game on 30 January 2016, in a quarter-final match between Leicester Riders and Surrey Scorchers in the British Basketball League Trophy, won by the Riders 77–60.

In 2018 Morningside Pharmaceuticals agreed to take the naming rights of the venue for three years.

The venue hosted the 2019 Champions League of Darts and the 2021 British Open in snooker.

International basketball matches

Other major sports events

References

External links

Basketball venues in England
Indoor arenas in England
Sports venues in Leicester
Leicester Riders
Sports venues completed in 2016
2016 establishments in England